1995–96 was the first season in which the Argentine Primera implemented the 3-points-for-a-win system. Vélez Sársfield were double champions, winning both the Apertura and Clausura tournaments. In international club football River Plate won the Copa Libertadores 1996 and Rosario Central won Copa CONMEBOL 1995.

Torneo Apertura ("Opening" Tournament)

Top Scorers

Torneo Clausura ("Closing" Tournament)

Top Scorers

Argentine clubs in international competitions

References

Argentina 1995-1996 by Pablo Wally at rsssf.
Argentina 1990s by Osvaldo José Gorgazzi and Victor Hugo Kurhy at rsssf.
Copa CONMEBOL 1995 by Juan Pablo Andrés and Julio Bovi Diogo at rsssf.
Copa Libertadores 1996 by Karel Stokkermans at rsssf.

 

it:Campionato di calcio argentino 1995-1996
pl:I liga argentyńska w piłce nożnej (1995/1996)